30th BSFC Awards
December 13, 2009

Best Film:
The Hurt Locker
The 30th Boston Society of Film Critics Awards, honoring the best in filmmaking in 2009, were given on December 13, 2009.

Winners

 Best Film:
 The Hurt Locker
Runner-up: A Serious Man
 Best Actor:
 Jeremy Renner – The Hurt Locker
 Best Actress:
 Meryl Streep – Julie & Julia
Runner-up: Gabourey Sidibe – Precious
 Best Supporting Actor:
 Christoph Waltz – Inglourious Basterds
Runner-up: Stanley Tucci – Julie & Julia
 Best Supporting Actress:
 Mo'Nique – Precious
Runner-up: Anna Kendrick – Up in the Air
 Best Director:
 Kathryn Bigelow – The Hurt Locker
 Best Screenplay:
 Joel and Ethan Coen – A Serious Man
Runner-up: Mark Boal – The Hurt Locker
 Best Cinematography:
 Barry Ackroyd – The Hurt Locker
Runner-up: Roger Deakins – A Serious Man
 Best Documentary:
 The Cove
 Best Foreign-Language Film:
 Summer Hours (L'heure d'été) • France
 Best Animated Film:
 Up
Runner-up: Fantastic Mr. Fox
 Best Editing:
 Bob Murawski and Chris Innis – The Hurt Locker
Runner-up: Roderick Jaynes – A Serious Man
 Best New Filmmaker:
 Neill Blomkamp – District 9
 Best Ensemble Cast (TIE):
 Precious
 Star Trek
Runner-up: A Serious Man
 Best Use of Music in a Film:
 Crazy Heart

External links
 Past Winners

References
 Hub critics name `Hurt Locker' year's best Boston Globe
 Inside the Boston Society of Film Critics' Hurt Locker Lovefest New York Magazine

2009
2009 film awards
2009 awards in the United States
2009 in Boston
December 2009 events in the United States